Human error
Human factors and ergonomics